The uninhabited Nuvuk Islands, members of the Arctic Archipelago, are located in the Hudson Bay, at the western outlet of Digges Sound, just west of the Ungava Peninsula. The island group is a part of the Qikiqtaaluk Region, in the Canadian territory of Nunavut.

References 

Islands of Hudson Bay
Uninhabited islands of Qikiqtaaluk Region